Fatou Jagne Senghore also known as Fatou Jagne Senghor (Fatou Diagne Senghor) is a Gambian Jurist, human rights advocate, women's rights and free expression activist. She is well known for her work in human rights in West Africa especially in The Gambia and Senegal  She earned the nickname of "Senegambian Iron Lady" for her efforts defending  human rights in The Gambia under the autocratic leadership of Yahya Jammeh.

Early life and education 
Born in the Gambia, Her father was a Senegalese and her mother was a Gambian. She attended an elementary school in Dakar after moving to Senegal. Jagne married Alasan Senghore who works for International Federation of Red Cross and Red Crescent Societies.

Education

After completing her primary education in Senegal, Jagne Senghor returned to The Gambia and graduated from the Lycée Sénégalais de Banjul with a Baccalauréat degree in 1991. She studied briefly law from the Cheikh Anta Diop University in 1991 before moving to France in 1992.[4] 

In 1996,  she graduated with Bachelor of law from the University of Toulouse Capitole. The same year, she obtained a diploma in International Relations and Development Studies and a Bachelor of English language/comparative law. 

In 1997, she completed a master's degree in International and European Law from the University of Toulouse, France in 1997.[5] and an LLM in economic and communication law under a fellowship of the University of Toulouse in 1998.

Career

 

Jagne Senghor has over 20 years of experience working on human rights in Africa (gaining expertise on freedom of expression, access to information, media regulation and the African regional system of human rights). In 1998, she returned to The Gambia. She worked as a programme officer at the Institute for Human Rights and Development in Africa in Banjul from 1999 to 2001. She was instrumental in initiating several training programmes for lawyers and judiciary and started the first compilation of the Decisions of the African Commission on Human and Peoples' Rights (ACHPR). Jagne Senghor also served as a freelance reporter and news presenter for the french weekly news for Gambia Radio and Television Service (GRTS). In February 2002, she joined the British-based human rights organisation Article 19 as the Africa Program Officer in Johannesburg. She has worked with various governments and non-governmental organisations on reforming media policies and freedom of expression in Africa. Jagne Senghor has also taken part in various litigation and campaigns on behalf of victims of human rights violations in Zimbabwe, Mauritania, Eritrea and The Gambia.

She worked with women organisations in Senegal to raise public awareness on the parity law adopted in 2010 to facilitate women access to the media. She has also participated in many supportive programmes development for Article 19 in Tunisia and Tunisia Monitoring Group. Jagne Senghor also conducted investigations regarding restrictions on freedom of expression in Tunisia representing Article19, founding member of International Freedom of Expression Exchange. In 2010, She established the West African branch of Article 19 in Senegal, rising up in the ranks to become regional director in 2013.

For two decades, she supported the work of the African Commission on Human Rights and the Rights of the People (ACHPR) and led the advocacy for the adoption of the declaration of a declaration of Principles on Freedom of Expression in Africa. She also supported the development of the framework for the establishment of mechanism of the Special Rapporteur on Freedom of Expression in Africa in 2015.

Honours 
In April 2018, Jagne Senghore was awarded the prestigious honour of Chevalier dans I'Ordre National du Mérite (Knight of the National Order of Merit/Ordre national du Mérite) by the President of France. She was also listed among the 100 Most Influential African Women in 2019 and was awarded the West African Shield Award by the Pan-African Human Rights Defender Network in June 2019.

In 2020, she received the Gambia Press Union Press Freedom Hero Award and in 2021, the Deyda Hydara Award for Press Freedom. 

In 2019, she was appointed as Chair of the Board of Directors of the Gambia Radio and Television Services (GRTS)by the President of the Gambia, Adama Barrow. In 2022, she was elected Chair of the Governing Council of the African Freedom of Information Center (AFIC). In June 2020, it was announced that Jagne Senghore was one of the four candidates for the position of UN Special Rapporteur on the Promotion and Protection of the Right to Freedom of Opinion and Expression. Other candidates were Irene Khan, Nani Jansen Reventlow and Agustina del Campo. Irene Khan got the position.

References 

https://www.gpuawards.gm/HallOfFame/Detail/16 ==
Living people 
Gambian feminists 
Gambian women's rights activists 
Gambian women activists 
Gambian women lawyers 
Year of birth missing (living people) 
University of Toulouse alumni 
Cheikh Anta Diop University alumni 
People from Banjul 
21st-century Gambian lawyers